Tragedy is the second studio album by Serbian heavy metal band Forever Storm, released in December 2013 by EBM Records from Mexico.

Track listing 
"Inceptum Finis" - 1:43
"Mother" - 4:57
"Made of Lies" - 4:57
"Forever the Same" - 4:57
"Tragedy" - 5:14
"Nocturnal Wings" - 5:22
"Carry on the Flame" - 5:16
"Paradox" - 4:26
"City of Vultures" - 4:36
"Flames of Reason" - 4:51
"Death Comes Alive" - 5:11
"Euthanasia For Mankind" - 5:59
"The Leaving" [bonus track] - 4:38

Personnel 
Stefan Kovačević - vocals, guitar
Miloš Miletić - guitar
Vladimir Nestrorović - bass guitar
Vuk Stefanović - drums
Nikola Marić, Stefan Kovačević, Vladimir Nestrorović - keyboards
Milica Vasović, Dušan Bozinovski - Additional orchestration

Production 
Ivan Ilić - mixing, producer
Dobrica Andrić - engineer
Joey Sturgis - mastering engineer

2013 albums
Forever Storm albums